Serifos miners strike was a strike action by the workers of Serifos mines that occurred in the summer of 1916 and resulted in the workers taking control of the island after a fight with the police. Five workers and four police officers died during the fight. The strike and the events that followed caused the government to send a warship and to imprison some strikers. However, many of the workers' demands were satisfied, including the establishment of the 8-hour workday for the first time in Greece.

Background

Serifos' mines came under control of Emilios Gromman in 1885. Several small land owners were stripped of their land, in many occasions forcibly, with a miner's wage as an exchange. The mining activities resulted in the radical growth of the island's population, due to incoming workers and their families: from 2134 inhabitants in 1880, the population had reached 4000 by the early 1910s. Emilios Gromman died in 1905 and the mines were inherited by his son who proved to be a far worse employer. According to testimonies of the inhabitants of the island the working conditions were inhumane: the workday was from sunrise to sunset without a break 6 days per week, no worker protection equipment was used and the wage was barely enough for the workers to survive. In the biennium 1914-1916 60 workers lost their lives. The workers were not even allowed to go outside to urinate or defecate and a barrel was used for this.

In July 24, 1916, the workers, motivated by anarcho-syndicalist Konstantinos Speras, formed a union named "Union of Workingmen and Miners of Serifos". Speras became its first president. The union's statutory text, signed by 460 members, demanded the reduce of the working day to 8 hours, increases in the wages and safety measures.

The strike
On August 7, the workers refused to load the mining production to the ship that was to carry it away, until their demands were satisfied. The management refused and informed the government about the events. The strike went on without violence until the 21st of August when a police squad of 30 officers under the orders of Charilaos Chryssanthou arrested the leadership of the union and ordered the workers to start loading the ship in 5 minutes otherwise they would fire. Chryssanthou fired and killed one of the strikers before the 5 minute notice had passed. The other police officers started firing too, and the workers (over 400 in numbers) along with their families responded by throwing rocks to the police officers killing four of them and forcing the rest to retreat. According to some sources the bodies of Chryssanthou and the other dead police officers were then thrown to the sea.

Aftermath
After the bloody events, the workers captured some of the main buildings such as the police headquarters and the city hall and took control of the island. Disappointed by the Greek state, the workers raised a French flag and called the French navy force stationed in Milos (a neighboring island) to help attending the wounded and to  negotiate joining France. The French refused to avoid intervening with internal Greek affairs and then the Greek government sent a warship with 250 soldiers and arrested the leadership of the worker's movement. However due to the popular support of the strike by the island's residents, some of the demands of the strikers were satisfied: the work-day was reduced to 8 hours per day for the first time in Greece, wages were increased and the transport to and from the mines was covered by the company.

The initiator of the strike, Konstantinos Speras, wrote a book named "Η απεργία της Σερίφου" ("The strike of Serifos") about the events.

Commemoration
The local community has raised a monument for the workers that died during the strike and for those that stood with them and each year organizes a ceremony in honor of the fallen. A statue of Speras has also been raised.

See also 

 Kalamata dock workers' strike
 Kileler uprising

References 

1916 in Greece
1916 labor disputes and strikes
Anarcho-syndicalism
Greece in World War I
Labor disputes in Greece
Miners' labor disputes